Beira  can refer to:

Beira (mythology), the mother to all the gods and goddesses in the Celtic mythology of Scotland
Beira, Azores, a small village on São Jorge Island
Beira (Portugal), the name of a region (and former province) in north-central Portugal; three provinces were later known by the name:
Beira Alta Province (extinct)
Beira Baixa Province (extinct)
Beira Litoral Province (extinct)
Beira, Mozambique, a port city in Mozambique
Port of Beira, a Mozambican port
Beira Railroad Corporation, operating in Mozambique
Prince of Beira, a title within the Portuguese royal house
Beira (antelope) (scientific name Dorcatragus megalotis), a species of antelope
1474 Beira, an asteroid
Beira Lake, a lake in Colombo, Sri Lanka
Beira's Place, domestic violence service, based in Edinburgh, UK